Michorzewo  is a village in the administrative district of Gmina Kuślin, within Nowy Tomyśl County, Greater Poland Voivodeship, in west-central Poland.

References

Michorzewo